Sadków may refer to the following places in Poland:
Sadków, Oleśnica County in Lower Silesian Voivodeship (south-west Poland)
Sadków, Wrocław County in Lower Silesian Voivodeship (south-west Poland)
Sadków, Świętokrzyskie Voivodeship (south-central Poland)
Sadków, Masovian Voivodeship (east-central Poland)